Gurani  may refer to:

Places 
 Gurani, a village in Pietroasa, Bihor County, Romania
 Gurani Rural District in Iran

Other uses 
 Gorani language, Western Iranian language

See also 
 Gorani (disambiguation)
 Guarani (disambiguation)